Sir John William Ramsden, 5th Baronet (14 September 1831 – 15 April 1914) was a British Liberal Party politician.

Biography

Ramsden was born on 14 September 1831 to John Charles Ramsden and his wife Isabella Dundas.

He was elected as a Member of Parliament (MP) for Taunton from 1853 to 1857, and for Hythe in 1857, serving as Under-Secretary of State for War from 1857 to 1858. He resigned through appointment as Steward of the Chiltern Hundreds on 9 February 1859. for the West Riding of Yorkshire from 1859 to 1865, for Monmouth from 1868 to 1874, for the Eastern West Riding of Yorkshire from 1880 to 1885, and finally for Osgoldcross from 1885 to 1886.

He stood as Liberal Unionist candidate for Osgoldcross in 1886.

He served as High Sheriff of Yorkshire in 1868.  He was Lord of the Manor of Huddersfield, and owner of a large proportion of the town as well as a total of 11,248 acres of the West Riding.  In addition he acquired in 1876 a 138,000 acre deer forest at Ardverikie, Laggan, Inverness-shire, and 800 acres of Lincolnshire.

On 2 August 1865 he married Lady Helen Guendolen Seymour, daughter of Edward Adolphus Seymour, 12th Duke of Somerset, thus acquiring the Bulstrode estate at Gerrards Cross. They had four children: Guendolen Isabella Jane, Hermione Charlotte, Rosamund Isabel and Sir John Frescheville.

Links with the University of Huddersfield 
In 1825 there was an attempt to set up a Scientific and Mechanics Institution in Huddersfield. Supported by a group of donors,  Sir John William  Ramsden later  became the institution's Patron. Its aims were to instruct local mechanics and tradesmen in scientific principles relating to their work, through lectures and a circulation library. It later became part of the Huddersfield Philosophical Society. Subsequent educational initiatives in Huddersfield included the Young Men's Mental Improvement Society, the Huddersfield Mechanics' Institution, and the Technical School.  The Technical School and Mechanic's Institute merged to become the Technical College, which subsequently became the College of Technology, then Huddersfield Polytechnic, before being granted University status as the University of Huddersfield in 1992.

The Ramsden Building, named after Sir John William Ramsden, was opened in 1883 by the Huddersfield Technical School and Mechanics' Institute and is situated on Queen Street South, between Milton Church and St Paul's Church.  The Ramsden Building is now part of the University of Huddersfield campus.

References

External links 
 
History of Ardverikie

1831 births
1914 deaths
Whig (British political party) MPs for English constituencies
Liberal Party (UK) MPs for Welsh constituencies
UK MPs 1852–1857
UK MPs 1857–1859
UK MPs 1859–1865
UK MPs 1868–1874
UK MPs 1880–1885
UK MPs 1885–1886
Baronets in the Baronetage of England
High Sheriffs of Yorkshire
Liberal Unionist Party MPs for English constituencies